The squash competition at the 2018 Central American and Caribbean Games was held from 20 to 26 July at the Club Campestre de Cali in Cali, Colombia.

Medal summary

Men's events

Women's events

Mixed events

Medal table

References

External links
2018 Central American and Caribbean Games – Squash

2018 Central American and Caribbean Games events
Central American and Caribbean Games
2018
Central American and Caribbean Games